The rima vestibuli is a space in the laryngeal cavity.

It is to the vestibular ligaments (vestibular folds once covered with mucous membrane) what the rima glottidis is to the vocal ligaments (vocal folds once covered with mucous membrane) the space formed when the folds are separated. It can be defined as the space in between the false vocal cords.

See also
 Rima glottidis

Human head and neck